Mount Wilson is a summit in the U.S. state of Nevada.

Mount Wilson was named after David Wilson.

References

Mountains of Lyon County, Nevada